Red Letter Year is the 16th studio album by singer-songwriter Ani DiFranco, released on September 30, 2008.

Says DiFranco about the album: “When I listen to my new record, I hear a very relaxed me, which I think has been absent in a lot of my recorded canon.  Now I feel like I’m in a really good place. My partner Mike Napolitano co-produced this record – my guitar and voice have never sounded better, and that’s because of him. I’ve got this great band and crew. And my baby, she teaches me how to just be in my skin, to do less and be more.”

Track listing

Personnel
Ani DiFranco – vocals, acoustic and electric guitars, tenor guitar, 12 string guitar, guitar synth, ukuleles, optigan, Wurlitzer, synthesizers, percussion 
Todd Sickafoose – Fender bass, bowed basses, piano, Wurlitzer, pump organ, synthesizer
Mike Dillon – marimba, vibraphone, percussion, tubular bells
Allison Miller – drums, percussion
String quartet on tracks 1, 2, 6, 7, 8 (arranged by Todd Sickafoose)
Jenny Scheinman – violin
Megan Gould – violin
Jessica Troy – viola
Marika Hughes – cello
C. C. Adcock – electric guitar on tracks 3, 4
Richard Comeaux – pedal steel guitar on tracks 3, 5, 10
Animal Prufrock – piano on track 4, percussion on track 6
Jeff Klein – vocals on track 6
Rene Lopez – percussion on track 6
Jon Hassell – trumpet on track 11
The Rebirth Brass Band on tracks 1 and 12
Phil Frazier – tuba (band leader)
Derrick Shezbie – trumpet
Glen Andrews – trumpet
Stafford Agee – trombone
Corey Henry – trombone
Vincent Broussard – saxophone
Byron (Flee) Bernard – saxophone
Derrick Tabb – snare drum
Shorty Frazier – bass drum

Production 
Produced by Mike Napolitano and Ani DiFranco
Recorded and mixed by Mike Napolitano at The Dugout, New Orleans, Louisiana and at Dockside, Maurice, Louisiana
Additional engineers at Dockside – David Rashou, Corie Richie
Rebirth Brass Band recorded by Jack Miele at Fudge, New Orleans, Louisiana
Jon Hassell recorded by Jesse Voccia
Rene Lopez recorded by Ken Rich
Strings recorded by Tony Maimone at Studio G, Brooklyn, New York
Additional recording by Ani DiFranco and Todd Sickafoose

Charts
Album

References

External links
 

2008 albums
Ani DiFranco albums
Righteous Babe Records albums